J. D. Ford is an American politician, currently a member of the Indiana Senate. Elected in the 2018 elections, he represents Senate District 29 as a member of the United States Democratic Party. He earned a bachelor's degree from University of Akron in criminal justice and political science and a master's degree in education from Purdue University Northwest.

He was the first, and so far only, openly LGBT person elected to Indiana's state legislature.

He first ran for Indiana Senate District 29 in 2014 and lost to Republican incumbent Mike Delph but won four years later in a rematch.

In September 2020, he made a guest appearance on the podcast The Popular Vote.

In November 2020, he was elected as the Caucus Chair of the Indiana Senate Democrats. For the 2021 legislative session, Senator Ford serves on the following committees: Education and Career Development (Ranking Minority Member), Elections (Ranking Minority Member), Ethics, Family and Children Services (Ranking Minority Member), Homeland Security and Transportation (Ranking Minority Member), and Veterans Affairs and The Military (Ranking Minority Member).

In addition to these committee assignments, he serves on the Medicaid Advisory Committee, Civics Task Force, Redistricting Commission and formerly served on the Jail Overcrowding Task Force and Distressed Unit Appeals Board.

Electoral history

|+ Indiana Senate 29th District: Results 2014–2018
! Year
!
! Democratic
! Votes
! %
!
! Republican
! Votes
! %
!
! Third Party
! Party
! Votes
! %
|-
|2014
||
| |J. D. Ford
| |12,685
| |46%
|
| |Mike Delph
| |15,094
| |54%
|
|
|
|
|
|-
|2018
||
| |J. D. Ford
| |31,974
| |57%
|
| |Mike Delph
| |24,403
| |43%
|
|
|
|
|
|-
|2022
||
| |J. D. Ford
| |22,636
| |52%
|
| |Alex Choi
| |21,175
| |48%
|
|
|
|
|

References

Living people
Democratic Party Indiana state senators
LGBT state legislators in Indiana
21st-century American politicians
Gay politicians
1982 births